Alyaksandr Nyachayew (born 21 April 1994) is a Belarusian professional footballer who plays for Minsk.

Club career
On 19 January 2022, Nyachayew signed a 1.5-year contract with Azerbaijani club Sabah. On 29 December 2022, Nyachayew left Sabah after his contract was terminated by mutual agreement.

On 13 February 2023, Nyachayew signed a one-year contract with Minsk.

References

External links 
 
 

1994 births
Living people
Sportspeople from Brest, Belarus
Belarusian footballers
Association football goalkeepers
Belarus under-21 international footballers
FC Dynamo Brest players
FC Kobrin players
FC Lida players
FC Rukh Brest players
Sabah FC (Azerbaijan) players
FC Minsk players
Belarusian Premier League players
Belarusian First League players
Belarusian expatriate footballers
Expatriate footballers in Azerbaijan
Belarusian expatriate sportspeople in Azerbaijan